Detective Chinatown 3 is a 2021 Chinese comedy mystery buddy film directed and written by Chen Sicheng, starring Wang Baoqiang and Liu Haoran. It is a sequel to Detective Chinatown 2 (2018) and is the third installment in the Detective Chinatown series. It was released on 12 February 2021.

The film set several box office records, including the biggest opening weekend ever in a single territory. Grossing over US$699 million, becoming the highest-grossing non-American R-rated film of all time. It is also the sixth-highest-grossing film of 2021 and the sixth-highest-grossing non-English film of all time.

Plot 
After the events in Bangkok and New York, Tang Ren and Qin Feng are invited to Tokyo to investigate another crime that has occurred there, leading to a battle between the strongest detectives in Asia. The film starts with Tang and Qin on plane eating junk food and Tang needs to use the bathroom. Later, he was escorted to meet the suspected murder of the Don who stated not guilty. Following examination of the body, Tang found a needle prick in the victim's body, which was not reported in the autopsy report. Also, he used a visual stimulisor of the broken glasses and found the missing glass from the murdered Don´s car. Tang convinces the judge that Anna had committed the murder by showing the murder weapon and examining the CCTV footages. Anna was the daughter of the suspected murderer, who left her and her mother in their worst times. Driven by revenge of her mother's sufferings and death, Anna planned to make her father suffer, by making him suspect of the murder she had committed. The film ends with all the detectives from the investigation app united against Q, who turned out to be a group of individuals with high IQ, planning to destroy the established systems of the world.

Cast 
 Wang Baoqiang as Tang Ren
 Liu Haoran as Qin Feng
 Satoshi Tsumabuki as Hiroshi Noda
 Tony Jaa as Jack Jaa
 Masami Nagasawa as Anna Kobayashi
Tomokazu Miura as Masaru Watanabe
Tadanobu Asano as Naoki Tanaka
 Shang Yuxian as Kiko
 Honami Suzuki as Yoshiko Kawamaru 
 Shōta Sometani as Akira Murata 
 Cheng Xiao as Lu Jingjing
 Chen Zheyuan as Kouji Noda
Zhang Zifeng as Snow
Xiao Yang as Song Yi

Release 
The film was initially planned for release in China for the 2020 Chinese New Year but the release was postponed due to the COVID-19 pandemic in China. The film was rescheduled and released on February 12, 2021.

Reception

Box office 
Detective Chinatown 3 made RMB 673 million ($104 million) in advance tickets for its opening day and RMB 950 million ($147 million) for its first week, the highest amount ever in China beating Avengers: Endgame ($95.5 million) and resulting in a projected opening weekend of over $200 million. The film grossed $163 million (RMB 1.05 billion) on its first day of release, the biggest opening day in world history (beating Endgames $157 million in North America) and pushing weekend projections to as high as $400 million. The film ended up debuting to RMB 2.56 billion ($398 million), becoming the biggest opening weekend ever in a single territory (beating Endgames $357 million in April 2019). The film grossed over US$424 million in its opening weekend, making it the ninth-highest-grossing opening for a film. By the end of its second weekend the film had a running total of RMB 4.36 billion ($673 million), making it the fifth-highest-grossing film of 2021 and the sixth-highest-grossing non-English film of all time.

Critical response 
Peter Bradshaw of The Guardian gave the film 3/5 stars, calling it "more no-holds-barred slapstick action". Todd McCarthy of Deadline Hollywood was less favorable, writing: "Its enormous box office numbers notwithstanding, I have to rate Detective Chinatown 3 as something of a disappointment after the raucously engaging first two entries." John Berra of Screen International gave the film a favorable review, writing that it "exudes a heightened zaniness which is most welcome in today's largely homogenised franchise landscape" and "is an insanely colourful, no expense spared blockbuster".

Chinese audiences on Maoyan gave the film a 8.8/10, while those on Douban gave it an average score of 5.6.

References

External links 
 

2020s buddy comedy films
2020s comedy mystery films
2020s Mandarin-language films
2020s spy comedy films
2021 action comedy films
2021 films
Chinese action comedy films
Chinese comedy mystery films
Chinese detective films
Chinese New Year films
Chinese sequel films
Films directed by Chen Sicheng
Films postponed due to the COVID-19 pandemic
Films scored by Nathan Wang
Films set in Japan
Films set in Tokyo
IMAX films
Warner Bros. films
Wanda Pictures films
Yakuza films